

Events
1 January – The Victorian television market is aggregated, with VIC TV (now WIN Television) becoming the Nine Network affiliate, Prime Television taking a Seven Network affiliation & Southern Cross Network (now Southern Cross Ten) taking the Network Ten affiliation.
3 January – The long-running British science fiction series Doctor Who airs its finale broadcast on ABC with the fourth and final part of the seventh and final serial of Season 18, Logopolis. For the rest of 1992 there were no more broadcasts of Doctor Who. In March 1993 the first serial of Season 19, Castrovalva, was broadcast. The show would finish airing on 3 March 1994.
6 January – Neighbours and Home and Away return for 1992 now both screening against each other in the 7:30 pm timeslot.
20 January – Network Ten launches weeknight "First at Five" news on its five capital city stations.
20 January – Bert Newton returns to television as host of a new talk show on Network Ten The Morning Show.
20 January – Former ABC reporter Stan Grant presents a new nightly current affairs program called Real Life on Seven Network.
27 January – Australian evening current affairs program The 7.30 Report returns to ABC for the new year.
3 February – Ex-Europe Correspondent Ian Henderson takes over as newsreader for the 7.00 pm ABC News in Victoria after Mary Delahunty left to replace John Jost for the Victoria Edition of The 7.30 Report.
3 February – Australian pioneering lifestyle program Healthy, Wealthy and Wise makes its debut and begins a seven-year run on Network Ten.
8 February – Network Ten's troubled soap opera Neighbours is another attempt to bring back to its former 1980s ratings glory, producers are ramping up the show's storylines as well as writing out four cast members while signing up three new faces. Lorraine Bayly, Jeremy Angerson, Andrew Williams and Gillian Blakeney being terminated and are all leaving the show in coming weeks – while Ben Mitchell and Felice Arena are joining the series, and former guest star and future recording artist Natalie Imbruglia is returning for an ongoing role. Producer Don Battye is confident of re-signing Melissa Bell (the current Lucy Robinson) when her contract expires mid-year, despite moves to have her swap over to Ten's other evening soap, E Street. Veteran actor Tom Oliver has been re-signed with Neighbours, with plans to romantically match up his character Lou Carpenter to now-widowed Madge Bishop (Anne Charleston). Producers are also casting for two teenagers to enter the series as Carpenter's children. Another romantic storyline being devised by writers is set to involve Lucy (Melissa Bell) and Brad Willis (Scott Michaelson). 
9 February – Three of Nine Network's current affairs lineup programmes 60 Minutes, Sunday and Business Sunday return for another year.
9 February – French-American-Canadian animated series Inspector Gadget airs on ABC as a stand-alone for the very last time. The series will continue airing on Sunday mornings when it returns to air as part of the Sunday morning wrapper programme Couch Potato on 22 March.
10 February – Australian comedy series Mother and Son returns for a new series on ABC.
10 February – The Nine Network launches a new game show called Supermarket Sweep presented by Ian Turpie, making his last game show appearance before his passing in 2012.
12 February – American sitcom Home Improvement based on the stand-up comedy of Tim Allen debuts on Seven Network.
13 February – Simon Westaway, Paul Sonkkila, Ben Steel, David Bradshaw and Sean Scully star in a brand new Australian police drama series Phoenix on ABC.
14 February – Australian gardening and lifestyle series Burke's Backyard returns for another year. This time host Don Burke is joined by presenters Dr. Harry Cooper, Peter Harris and Densey Clyne.
15 February – Australian five minute cooking program Consuming Passions hosted by British chef Ian Parmenter premieres on the ABC.
22 February – Australian gardening and lifestyle series Burke's Backyard begins airing in New Zealand on TV One.
1 March - The Nine Network revamps it's on air presentation and launches the famous "Skyscraper" ident
3 March - Nine's adult drama series, Chances, launches on British satellite channel, Sky One, airing Wednesday and Thursday at 9pm.
14 March – Australian documentary series Foreign Correspondent debuts on the ABC.
20 March – The Nine Network takes over the Rugby League TV rights from Network Ten, which they continue to broadcast to the present day.
30 April – Series final of the Australian police drama series Phoenix airs on ABC.
6 April - Network Ten's evening soap opera, E Street, launches in the UK on the Sky One satellite channel. It airs in a half-hour format, 6.30pm, Monday to Friday, starting with episode 43.
4 May – Australian children's TV series Skippy the Bush Kangaroo returns to Australian television screens with a short-lived reboot called The Adventures of Skippy. This series focused on Sonny Hammond who is now an adult having followed in his father's footsteps by becoming a ranger at a wildlife park and having his own family and Skippy as a pet kangaroo.
8 May – Australian children's educational TV series Lift Off debuts on ABC at 2:00 pm every Friday. It later aired weekdays at 4:30 pm on 29 June and on Saturdays at 6:00 pm on 19 September.
14 May – A new Australian travel and lifestyle television program Getaway begins its first screening on Nine Network becoming one of the longest running series on Australian television.
18 May – Australian soap opera Neighbours debuts a new set of opening titles and a new theme song performed by Greg Hind. 
8 June – Australian teen game show Vidiot presented by Eden Gaha debuts on ABC.
13 July - Teenager Todd Landers (Kristian Schimid) is killed by an oncoming van in his final episode of Neighbours.
18 July – Australian comedy series The Late Show starring The D-Generation starts airing on the ABC running for two seasons.
20 July – ABC debuts children's TV series Bananas in Pyjamas.
4 September – Kerry Packer and the Nine Network pull the plug on Australia's Naughtiest Home Videos midway through the show.
6 November – Final episode of the Australian children's game show Big Square Eye airs on the ABC. The series will be shown one last time the next year at 6:00 pm.
26 November – Accident-prone comedy sketch show Fast forward airs its final episode on Seven Network. It returns in 1993 with the rebranded name Full Frontal, which is the same as FF. Fast Forward continued specials in 1993 and 1994.
21 December – Network Ten debuts a new weekday morning program for children called The Big Breakfast.
22 December – Seven Network airs the 1992 Midori Australian Dancesport Championships at 9:30 pm.

Debuts

International programming

Changes to network affiliation
This is a list of programs which made their premiere on an Australian television network that had previously premiered on another Australian television network. The networks involved in the switch of allegiances are predominantly both free-to-air networks or both subscription television networks. Programs that have their free-to-air/subscription television premiere, after previously premiering on the opposite platform (free-to air to subscription/subscription to free-to air) are not included. In some cases, programs may still air on the original television network. This occurs predominantly with programs shared between subscription television networks.

International

Television shows

ABC TV
 Mr. Squiggle and Friends (1959–1999)
 Four Corners (1961–present)
 Rage (1987–present)
 G.P. (1989–1996)
 Foreign Correspondent (1992–present)
 The Late Show (1992–1993)
 Vidiot (1992–1995)

Seven Network
 Wheel of Fortune (1981–1996, 1996–2003, 2004-beyond)
 A Country Practice (1981–1994)
 Home and Away (1988–present)
 Family Feud (1988–1996)
 Fast forward (1989–1992)

Nine Network
 Sunday (1981–2008)
 Today (1982 – present)
 Sale of the Century (1980–2001)
 A Current Affair (1971–1978, 1988–2005, 2006–present)
 Hey Hey It's Saturday (1971–1999)
 The Midday Show (1973–1998)
 60 Minutes (1979–present)
 The Flying Doctors (1986–1991)
 Australia's Funniest Home Video Show (1990–present)
 Hey Hey It's Saturday (1971–1999)

Network Ten
 Neighbours (1985 – present)
 E Street (1989–1993)
 Good Morning Australia with Bert Newton (1991)

Ending this year

See also
 1992 in Australia
 List of Australian films of 1992

References